Andrea Busiri Vici (7 January 1818 – 12 November 1911) was a significant papal architect in Rome. He was descended from a long-flourishing dynasty of French-Italian architects formed by the union of the French Beausire family with the Vici family of Arcevia.

Family
The progenitor of the French side of the dynasty was Jean Beausire (1651–1743), whose descendants thrived as architects under the Ancien Régime. On the Italian side, Andrea Vici (1743–1817) was a second-generation architect who gained regard for his work under Luigi Vanvitelli on the Palace of Caserta and later gained Vatican patronage. Andrea's daughter Barbara Vici married Beaurire's descendant Giulio Cesare Busiri (1792–1818) in 1815, joining the two families as Busiri Vici.

Noted members of the family include Clemente Busiri Vici (1887–1965), who designed churches for Pope Pius XI such Gran Madre di Dio and San Roberto Bellarmino, both in Rome. Clemente's brother Michele Busiri Vici (1894–1981) worked on Costa Smeralda. Another brother, Andrea Busiri Vici (1903–1989) was a celebrated architect, art critic and scholar who worked with his brother Clemente on San Roberto Bellarmino.

Notes

19th-century Italian architects
Italian families
1818 births
1911 deaths
Architects from Rome